Chrysopa is a genus of green lacewings in the neuropteran family Chrysopidae.

Members of this genus and the genus Chrysoperla are common in much of North America, Europe and Asia. They share similar characteristics and some species have been moved from one genus to the other and back again. Their larvae are predatory and feed on aphids and members of this genus have been used in biological pest control.

William Elford Leach first described this genus in 1815 in Brewster's Edinburgh Encyclopædia. Albert Koebele introduced species of Chrysopa to New Zealand in the 1890s, as a method to combat aphids, however no Chrysopa species were able to establish.

Species

References

External links

Chrysopidae
Insects used as insect pest control agents
Neuroptera genera